William Dillard may refer to:
 William T. Dillard, American businessman, founder of the Dillard's Department Stores chain
 William T. Dillard II, American heir and businessman
 Bill Dillard, American jazz trumpeter, actor and singer
 Harrison Dillard (William Harrison Dillard), American track and field athlete

See also
 William Dillard Homestead, Stone County, Arkansas